Masaka is a populated neighborhood within the city of Kigali, the capital and largest city of Rwanda.

Location
The coordinates of Masaka are: 01°59'44.0"S, 30°11'30.0"E (Latitude:-1.995556; Longitude:30.191667).

Overview
Masaka is a sparsely populated area with an estimated population of approximately 4,558, as of January 2018. In January 2018, the government of Rwanda selected this neighborhood to be the location of the cargo terminal of the western end of the Isaka–Kigali Standard Gauge Railway. The government of Rwanda is in the process of developing a cargo center in the Masaka neighborhood.

Points of interest
The following points of interest lie in or near Masaka: (a) The KK3 Road (RN3), the main route leading east, out of the city of Kigali (b) Masaka Hospital (c) Masaka Trade Center (d) Masaka Mosque (e) Masaka Kingdom Hall of Johovah's Witnesses (f) Masaka Farms, a restaurant and (g) The cargo terminal of the Isaka-Kigali Standard Gauge Railway will be constructed here.

References

External links
Map Showing Boundaries of Masaka, Kigali, Rwanda

Gasabo District
Kigali
Populated places in Rwanda